Lucas Duque (born March 15, 1984) is a Brazilian rugby union player. He represented Brazil at the 2011 and 2015 Pan American Games in rugby sevens. He also played at the 2013 South American Rugby Championship "A". Duque is the current captain of Brazil's men's sevens team. He was selected for Brazil's Olympic sevens team to the 2016 Summer Olympics.

His brother Moisés Duque is also a rugby player. He and his brother were part of the Brazilian team that defeated the United States 24–23 at the 2016 Americas Rugby Championship.

References

External links 
 

1984 births
Living people
Brazilian rugby union players
People from São José dos Campos
Olympic rugby sevens players of Brazil
Brazil international rugby sevens players
Rugby sevens players at the 2016 Summer Olympics
Rugby sevens players at the 2019 Pan American Games
Rugby sevens players at the 2015 Pan American Games
Pan American Games competitors for Brazil
Brazilian rugby sevens players
Sportspeople from São Paulo (state)
Brazil international rugby union players
21st-century Brazilian people